The North Carolina General Assembly 2023–2024 session was the state legislature that first convened in January 2023 and will conclude in December 2024. Members of the North Carolina Senate and the North Carolina House of Representatives were elected in November 2022.

House of Representatives
The House of Representatives leadership and members are listed below.

House Leadership

House Members

The following table shows the district, party, counties represented, and date first elected of members of the House of Representatives. The representatives were elected in new districts districts passed by the General Assembly in 2022 (House Bill 980 of the 2021-2022 session) to account for population changes following the 2020 census.

↑: Member was first appointed to office.

Senate
The North Carolina Senate leadership and members are listed below.

Senate leadership

Members of the Senate
The district, party, home residence, counties represented, and date first elected is listed below for the members of the Senate.. The representatives were elected in new districts passed by the General Assembly in 2022 (Senate Bill 744 of the 2021-2022 session) to account for population changes following the 2020 census.

↑: Member was originally appointed to fill the remainder of an unexpired term.

Notes

References

External links

2023
General Assembly
General Assembly
2023
2023
2023 U.S. legislative sessions